The Susquehanna Conduit or Big Inch project is a 108" water supply line built in the early 1960s, connecting the Deer Creek Pumping Station in Harford County, Maryland to Baltimore City.  This pipeline runs about 38 miles, parallel to Interstate 95, from the Susquehanna River to the Montibello Pumping Station in Baltimore City.

External links
Where Does the Water Come From? at the Baltimore City homepage

Buildings and structures in Harford County, Maryland
Buildings and structures in Baltimore
Water supply infrastructure in the United States
Water in Maryland